LXi REIT is a real estate investment trust based in London, England. It is listed on the London Stock Exchange and is a constituent of the FTSE 250 Index.

History
The company was established by Osprey Equity Partners with support from Ram Bhavnani, a wealthy Spanish investor, in 2016. Bhavnani's previous ventures included a significant investment in Bankinter, a Spanish-based bank. LXi REIT was the subject of an initial public offering in 2018.

Operations
The company has a portfolio of commercial properties rented out to corporate customers on 20 to 30-year inflation-linked leases. The net book value of the portfolio as at 31 March 2022 was £1.5 billion.

References

Financial services companies established in 2016
Real estate companies established in 2016
British companies established in 2016